Fernvale is an unincorporated community in Williamson County, Tennessee. The Harpeth Furnace, which is listed on the National Register of Historic Places, is located in Fernvale.

Notable People
Bill Lee, 50th Governor of Tennessee

References

Unincorporated communities in Williamson County, Tennessee
Unincorporated communities in Tennessee